Reworld Media is a French Media conglomerate created in 2012 by Pascal Chevalier. The group became in 2019 the first group for the number of press titles. 

The way the group operates is criticized by many journalists, who consider that the activity of the group is more akin to advertisement to journalism. In many cases after the acquisitions, many of the journalists in the acquired titles have resigned en-masse because of this behavior shortly after the acquisition.

Affiliates
 Auto Plus
 Be Magazine
 Biba (magazine)
 Campagne Décoration
 Closer
 Diapason
 Eclypsia
 Football365.fr
 Gourmand
 F1i
 Grazia
 Guerres et Histoire
 L'Auto-Journal
 L'Ami des jardins et de la maison
 Le Chasseur français
 Le Journal de la maison
 Maison et Travaux
 Marie France
 Modes & Travaux
 Mon jardin et ma maison 
 Nous deux
 Pleine Vie
 Psychologies Magazine
 Rugby365
 Science et Vie
 Sport365.fr
 Sport Auto
 Télé Magazine
 Télé Poche
 Télé Star
 Top santé
 'Tradedoubler''

References

External links
 Official website

French companies established in 2012
Mass media companies